This is a list of state leaders aged 30 or younger when they assumed office (since 1900). It does not include leaders who did not assume power in their own right, or leaders who served under colonial rule.

Monarchs

Non-royal leaders

See also
Lists of state leaders
List of oldest living state leaders

References

Youngest
Lists of heads of government
State leaders